Michelle Anne Akers (formerly Akers-Stahl; born February 1, 1966) is an American former soccer player who starred in the 1991 and 1999 Women's World Cup and 1996 Olympics victories by the United States. At the 1991 World Cup, she won the Golden Shoe as the top scorer, with ten goals.

Akers is regarded as one of the greatest female football players in history.  She was named FIFA Female Player of the Century in 2002, an award she shared with China's Sun Wen. In 2004, Akers and Mia Hamm were the only two women named to the FIFA 100, a list of the 125 greatest living soccer players selected by Pelé and commissioned by FIFA for that organization's 100th anniversary.

Akers is a member of the (U.S.) National Soccer Hall of Fame; she was inducted in 2004, along with Paul Caligiuri and Eric Wynalda.

Early life
Born to Robert and Anne Akers in Santa Clara, California on February 1, 1966, Akers grew up in the Seattle, Washington suburb of Shoreline, where she attended and played soccer for Shorecrest High School. Early in her career, she was not sure whether she was willing to do the training necessary to excel. After losing a youth game, she was frustrated and walked off the field in tears. Her father asked her "Did you have fun". Her answer was "yes" which led to the realization that this was the real reason she played, and that helped turn her into the fierce competitor she became. She was named an All-American three times during her high school career.

University of Central Florida
Akers attended the University of Central Florida on a scholarship where she was selected as four-time NCAA All-American. She was Central Florida's Athlete of the Year in 1988–89, was the all-time leading scorer in UCF history, won the Hermann Trophy in 1988 as the nation's top college soccer player, and had her #10 jersey retired by the school.

International career
Akers was a member of the 1985 United States women's national soccer team (USWNT) for its first-ever game, at a tournament in Italy in August 1985. Due to an ankle injury, she did not play in the first game. However, in the U.S.'s second-ever international game, she scored the first goal in the history of the program, in a 2–2 tie against Denmark.

Akers scored 15 goals in 24 games for the U.S. from 1985 to 1990, before scoring a team-record 39 goals in 26 games in the 1991 season. In 1990 and 1991 she was named the Female Athlete of the Year by the United States Soccer Federation (USSF).  Akers was also the lead scorer in the inaugural FIFA Women's World Cup in China in 1991, scoring ten goals, including five in one game. This led the U.S. women's team to the first women's world championship, defeating Norway 2–1 in the final. Akers scored both U.S. goals in the final.

After the 1991 World Cup, she shifted from striker to central midfielder, in part to minimize the beatings doled out by opposing defenders. Despite the precautions, Akers suffered a concussion and a knee injury early in the 1995 World Cup, and was hampered by the knee in the U.S.'s semifinal loss to Norway.

In 1996, Akers was again a member of the U.S. women's national team at the 1996 Summer Olympics in Atlanta, Georgia, where it won the first gold medal in Olympic Women's Soccer. She played with a torn medial collateral ligament in the holding central midfielder role, anchoring the team's defense, dominating in the air, and playmaking out of the back to maintain possession and generate goal-scoring opportunities. After the tournament her knee required reconstructive surgery for the third time. She was also a member of the gold medal-winning 1998 Goodwill Games team. On June 7, 1998, she was awarded the FIFA Order of Merit, FIFA's highest honor in the global game of soccer, for her contributions to the game of soccer on and off the field; she was the first woman ever to receive it. Akers again was a leader and member of the 1999 Women's World Cup team, where the team won their second World Cup championship. Despite playing with a dislocated shoulder, caused by a fan in the quarterfinals,
she was awarded the Bronze Ball of the tournament by FIFA.

Shortly before the 2000 Summer Olympics in Sydney, Australia, Akers retired from the game due to injuries incurred before and during the 1999 FIFA World Cup. She was the U.S. national team's second all-time leading scorer (behind Mia Hamm) with 105 goals, 37 assists and 247 points.

Coaching career
On January 19, 2022, the Orlando Pride announced Akers as an assistant coach for the 2022 season, serving under head coach Amanda Cromwell. She also served in a player development and mentorship role, and assisted with community outreach.

Personal life
From 1990 to 1994, she was married and was known as Michelle Akers-Stahl. Later she married again (2003–2007) and had a son in Orlando, Florida. As of 2011, she resided near Atlanta, Georgia, with her son Cody on a small farm doing horse rescue and animal welfare work.

Since her retirement from the USWNT in 2000, she has also continued to promote the game of soccer as a spokesperson, advocate, and leader on various platforms.

Career statistics

International goals

See also

 List of women's association football players with 100 or more international goals
 List of Olympic medalists in football
 List of 1996 Summer Olympics medal winners
 List of 2004 Summer Olympics medal winners
 List of players with the most goals in an association football game
 1985 United States women's national soccer team
 List of University of Central Florida alumni
 List of athletes on Wheaties boxes
 List of Golden Scarf recipients
 List of prizes named after people

References

Match reports

Further reading
 Grainey, Timothy (2012), Beyond Bend It Like Beckham: The Global Phenomenon of Women's Soccer, University of Nebraska Press,  
 Kassouf, Jeff (2011), Girls Play to Win Soccer, Norwood House Press, 
 LaFontaine, P.; Valutis, E.; Griffin, C.; Weisman, L. (2001), Companions in Courage: Triumphant Tales of Heroic Athletes, Hatchette Digital Inc., 
 Lisi, Clemente A. (2010), The U.S. Women's Soccer Team: An American Success Story, Scarecrow Press, 
 Longman, Jere (2009), The Girls of Summer: The U.S. Women's Soccer Team and How it Changed the World, HarperCollins, 
 Mitchell, N.; Ennis, L. (2007) Encyclopedia of Title IX and Sports, Greenwood Publishing Group, 
 Rutledge, Rachel (2000), The Best of the Best in Soccer, First Avenue Editions, 
 Silverman, Al (2004), It's Not Over 'til it's Over, Penguin,

External links
 National Soccer Hall of Fame biography
 
 Michelle Akers' U.S. Olympic Team bio
 Michelle Akers horse rescue website
 

1966 births
Living people
Sportspeople from Santa Clara, California
United States women's international soccer players
FIFA 100
National Soccer Hall of Fame members
Olympic gold medalists for the United States in soccer
Footballers at the 1996 Summer Olympics
UCF Knights women's soccer players
Soccer players from Orlando, Florida
FIFA Century Club
American women's soccer players
1991 FIFA Women's World Cup players
1995 FIFA Women's World Cup players
1999 FIFA Women's World Cup players
Tyresö FF players
FIFA Women's World Cup-winning players
Women's association football midfielders
Women's association football forwards
Medalists at the 1996 Summer Olympics
Hermann Trophy women's winners
Damallsvenskan players
Women's United Soccer Association commentators
Competitors at the 1998 Goodwill Games
American women's soccer coaches
Orlando Pride non-playing staff